"(I'm Gonna) Sing, Sing, Sing" is a hymn written by Hank Williams.  He performed it as part of a radio show for Mother's Best Flour in Nashville from January to March 1951.  MGM released the song as a posthumous single in 1954 with "Angel of Death" as the B-side.  The A-side was recorded as a demo sometime in 1950.

References

Sources
 

1954 singles
Hymns
Hank Williams songs
1951 songs
MGM Records singles
Songs written by Hank Williams